Custenau (Kustenaú) is an extinct Arawakan language of Brazil.

References

Arawakan languages